Sakon Nakhon Airport   is an airport in Sakon Nakhon, Thailand. It is used for civil and military purposes (Royal Thai Air Force).

Airlines and destinations

Accidents
On 23 September 1976, a Douglas C-47A (L2-40/15) of the Royal Thai Air Force was damaged beyond economic repair in a take-off accident.

Plans

Airports of Thailand PCL (AOT) is budgeting 220 billion baht in 2018 for the creation of two new airports and the expansion of four existing airports owned by the Department of Airports. Sakon Nakhon Airport is one of the four slated for expansion and AOT management. AOT intends to build Chiang Mai 2 in Lamphun Province and Phuket Airport 2 in Phang Nga Province. The three other existing airports to be managed by AOT are Chumphon Airport, Tak Airport, and Udon Thani International Airport.

References

External links

Airports in Thailand
Buildings and structures in Sakon Nakhon province
Airports established in 1972